Glidden  (also Chippewa Crossing)  is an unincorporated census-designated place in the town of Jacobs in Ashland County, Wisconsin, United States. It is located on County Highway N near Wisconsin Highway 13. As of the 2010 census, its population was 507.

History
The community is named after Charles R. Glidden, a founder of the Wisconsin Central Railroad, along which it is located. Marion Park Pavilion was built in 1938 during the depression and is listed in the National Register of Historic Places. The town immediately took on the title of "Black Bear Capital of the World", and many local businesses made "Black Bear" a part of their name. Glidden Public School also changed its mascot from the Viking to the Black Bear.

Geography
Glidden is located at  (46.1349525, -90.5785090).

Education
Local children are a part of the Chequamegon School District, which was created for the 2009–10 school year. Elementary students of the former Glidden School District - which served all students from the towns of Gordon, Jacobs, Peeksville, and Shanagolden, plus those from parts of the towns of Namakagon and Spider Lake- attend the Glidden campus building. Middle school students attend Chequamegon Middle School, which is also at the Glidden campus. High school students attend Chequamegon High School in Park Falls, Wisconsin. 
Glidden Public School was the home to all area students through the 2008–09 school year. The school's mascot was the Black Bear. The school was a part of a sports co-op with the Butternut School District from 2006–09 and won Indianhead Conference championships in baseball (2006) and softball (2009).

Transportation
Bus service to the community is provided by Bay Area Rural Transit.

Notable person
Franklin Matthias, United States Army officer, was born in Glidden.

Images

References

External links

School

Census-designated places in Ashland County, Wisconsin
Census-designated places in Wisconsin

nl:Glidden
vo:Glidden